Euthima is a genus of longhorn beetles of the subfamily Lamiinae, containing the following species:

 Euthima araujoi Martins, 1979
 Euthima rodens (Bates, 1865)
 Euthima variegata (Aurivillius, 1921)
 Euthima wendtae Martins, 1979

References

Onciderini